Khimik Yuzhne is a Ukrainian professional basketball club that is based in Yuzhne. The club plays in the Ukrainian Basketball SuperLeague. In 2006, the club reached the final of the EuroCup Challenge, where they were defeated by Ural Great Perm.

History
The team was founded in 2001 as BC Khimik. In the first season of the club, the team immediately finished in fourth place in the Ukrainian Basketball SuperLeague. In the 2014–15 season, Khimik won its first national championship after going undefeated in the entire season. In the regular season, Khimik finished 30–0 and in the Playoffs the team won all its six games. In 2016, Khimik repeated as national champions - winning the Ukrainian SL Favorit Sport (one of the two Ukrainian top tier basketball leagues).

In the 2018–19 season, Khimik won its third domestic championship.

Trophies
Ukrainian Championship
Winners (3): 2014–15, 2015–16, 2018–19
Ukrainian Cup
Winners (1): 2015–16

Season by season

Players

Current squad

Notable players

Notes

External links
Official Website 
Eurobasket.com BC Khimik Page

Basketball teams in Ukraine
Sport in Odesa Oblast
Basketball teams established in 2001
2001 establishments in Ukraine